Heliotropium arboreum is a species of flowering plant in the borage family, Boraginaceae. It is native to tropical Asia including southern China, Madagascar, northern Australia, and most of the atolls and high islands of Micronesia and Polynesia. Common names include velvetleaf soldierbush, tree heliotrope, veloutier, and octopus bush.

Taxonomy
Originally published as Tournefortia argentea, it was transferred to Argusia argentea, and remained under that name until recently. It was subsequently restored to the genus Tournefortia before being transferred into the genus Heliotropium under a new name in 2003.

Uses

Historically in the Maldives the leaves were often used as famine food.

Wood
The wood of H. arboreum is commonly used to make handicrafts, tools, and, in Polynesia, frames for swim goggles. Due to its availability, H. arboreum is used as firewood, and has become rare in some areas as a result.

Medicinal
Octopus bush is used in many Pacific islands as a traditional medicine to treat ciguatera fish poisoning, which is caused by powerful ciguatoxins produced by microscopic Gambierdiscus algae. Scientists from the Institute of Research for Development (IRD) and the Louis Malarde Institute in French Polynesia and Pasteur Institute in New Caledonia are researching the plant chemistry and believe that senescent leaves contain rosmarinic acid and derivatives, which are known for its antiviral, antibacterial, antioxidant, and anti-inflammatory properties. The researchers think that rosmarinic acid removes the ciguatoxins from their sites of action, as well as being an anti-inflammatory agent.

References

External links

 Plants of Midway Atoll

arboreum
Australasian realm flora
Indomalayan realm flora
Oceanian realm flora
Flora of the Western Indian Ocean
Flora of Malesia
Flora of the Pacific
Flora of Vietnam
Trees of Australia
Flora of India (region)
Flora of Ashmore and Cartier Islands
Flora of Christmas Island
Flora of the Coral Sea Islands Territory
Flora of the Maldives
Flora of the Northern Territory
Flora of Queensland
Flora of the Tubuai Islands
Lamiales of Australia
Eudicots of Western Australia
Least concern plants
Least concern flora of Oceania
Least concern biota of Asia
Least concern flora of Australia
Least concern biota of Queensland
Taxonomy articles created by Polbot
Leaf vegetables